ONE: Winter Warriors II (also known as ONE 149: Philippines vs. the World) was a Combat sport event produced by ONE Championship that took place on December 3, 2021 and aired on December 17, 2021, at the Singapore Indoor Stadium in Kallang, Singapore.

Background
A flyweight bout between the #2 ranked flyweight contender Danny Kingad and the #4 ranked Kairat Akhmetov was scheduled as the main event.

A bantamweight bout between Kwon Won Il and the former ONE Bantamweight champion Kevin Belingon was scheduled as the co-main event.

Former ONE Middleweight World Champion Vitaly Bigdash and Fan Rong were scheduled to fight in a 209 lb catchweight bout.

Results

See also 

 2021 in ONE Championship
 List of ONE Championship events
 List of current ONE fighters

References 

Events in Singapore
ONE Championship events
2021 in mixed martial arts
Mixed martial arts in Singapore
Sports competitions in Singapore
December 2021 sports events in Singapore